The following is a list of airlines that are based in the U.S. state of Hawaii.

Current airlines

Passenger

Cargo

Defunct airlines

References 

 
Hawaii
Airlines

Hawaii